Luis Ernesto Olascoaga Reyes (born 22 August 1991) is a Mexican footballer.

External links
 Luis Olascoaga at Club América
 Luis Olascoaga at Lobos BUAP
 

Living people
1991 births
Club América footballers
Club Necaxa footballers
Club Atlético Zacatepec players
Tlaxcala F.C. players
Lobos BUAP footballers
Loros UdeC footballers
Atlético Zacatepec footballers
Liga MX players
Ascenso MX players
Footballers from Mexico City
Mexican footballers
Association football forwards